Icici may refer to:
ICICI Bank, an Indian bank
Ičići, a town in Croatia